Darb Ziarat (also Romanized as Darb Zīārat; also known as Dar Zīārat) is a village in Nargesan Rural District, Jebalbarez-e Jonubi District, Anbarabad County, Kerman Province, Iran. At the 2006 census, its population was 82, in 16 families.

References 

Populated places in Anbarabad County